Cancer Institute may refer to one of the following organisations:
Australia
Peter MacCallum Cancer Centre
Breast Cancer Institute of Australia
Australian Cancer Council
NSW Breast Cancer Institute 
Cancer Institute of New South Wales
Europe
European Organisation for Research and Treatment of Cancer (EORTC)
India
Adyar Cancer Institute
United States
National Cancer Institute